Tabler's Station Historic District is a national historic district located near Martinsburg, Berkeley County, West Virginia. It encompasses 19 contributing buildings constructed between about 1890 and 1953.  It is primarily residential, but also includes the Tabler Presbyterian Church (c. 1900) and Shiftman Brothers Mattress Factory (c. 1940).  The houses are of wood-frame construction, between one and  stories in height, and are primarily vernacular in character.

It was listed on the National Register of Historic Places in 2004.

References

Historic districts in Berkeley County, West Virginia
Houses on the National Register of Historic Places in West Virginia
Gothic Revival architecture in West Virginia
Colonial Revival architecture in West Virginia
Houses in Berkeley County, West Virginia
Historic districts on the National Register of Historic Places in West Virginia
National Register of Historic Places in Berkeley County, West Virginia